Naz Dasht (also Romanized as Nāz Dasht) is a village in Momenabad Rural District, in the Central District of Sarbisheh County, South Khorasan Province, Iran. At the 2006 census, its population was 743, in 166 families.

References 

Populated places in Sarbisheh County